Sminthurinus aureus is a springtail of the family Katiannidae.

References

Collembola
Animals described in 1862
Taxa named by John Lubbock, 1st Baron Avebury